Atlas is the third studio album by the American indie rock band Real Estate, released on March 4, 2014, on Domino Records. It was their first album recorded with the drummer Jackson Pollis and keyboard player Matt Kallman, and the last with the lead guitarist and founding member Matt Mondanile.

Background
After touring for the album Days was finished, in late 2012 Real Estate took a break. While guitarist Mondanile and bass guitarist Alex Bleeker worked on their respective solo projects, lead singer and guitarist Martin Courtney married and was busy writing songs, which was something that he had started while touring. The band then spent winter and spring working on songs, taking up a total of eight to nine months on songwriting before recording commenced. In mid-2012 and throughout 2013, the band featured new material in their shows.

A friend of Real Estate suggested the album be produced by Jim O'Rourke, an idea which intrigued the band since they were fans of his work on Wilco's seminal album Yankee Hotel Foxtrot, and felt that his production style would fit with the "clean record" that they wanted to make. As the band was certain that working together would be unlikely given O'Rourke's enigmatic nature, their label proposed working with Tom Schick instead. Schick had co-produced Wilco's most recent album, The Whole Love, and was also the house engineer at The Loft, Wilco's studio in Chicago, Illinois. Since Wilco would be on tour, they gave Real Estate permission to record at the studio and use their gear, the first time for any band without Wilco's presence.

After mostly recording Days as a three-piece of Courtney, Mondanile and Bleeker, the addition of drummer Jackson Pollis – who had played with Real Estate since 2011 – enabled them to record basic tracks live as opposed to overdubbing tracks one by one. Before recording started, the band decided to add more sophisticated keyboard parts to be played by someone more proficient. Jonah Maurer, who joined Real Estate along with Pollis for the Days tour and performed several of the new songs live during his time in the band, had moved on to join Titus Andronicus. As a result, they recruited Matt Kallman, formerly of Girls, and had him write his own parts with a little direction. At one point, Wilco leader Jeff Tweedy visited the studio to witness the band recording several takes of a song that received glowing enthusiasm from him, but ultimately did not make the album.

The album was recorded over the summer and fall of 2013 at The Loft and The Magic Shop in New York City. The album was also mixed at the Magic Shop. The album was subsequently mastered by Greg Calbi at Sterling Sound in New York City with the bonus tracks being mastered by Joe Lambert at Joe Lambert Mastering.

Artwork
The artwork for the album comes from a mural painted by the Polish artist Stefan Knapp for the former department store chain Alexander's in Paramus, New Jersey.

The mural has since been disassembled following the close of Alexander's and the Bergen Museum of Art & Science's purchase of the mural. While various suggestions to the non-profit organization concerning its potential location have amassed, the mural was only recently put on display in Paterson, New Jersey, at the Art Factory in June 2015. The mural has yet to find a replacement location.

Reception

Atlas received widespread acclaim from contemporary music critics. At Metacritic, which assigns a normalized rating out of 100 to reviews from mainstream critics, the album received an average score of 78, based on 33 reviews, which indicates "generally favorable reviews". The album was recognized as one of The 100 Best Albums of the Decade So Far by Pitchfork in August 2014.

The album debuted at #34 on the Billboard Top 200 chart.

Track listing

Personnel
Martin Courtney – vocals, guitar
Matt Mondanile – acoustic and electric guitars
Alex Bleeker – bass guitar, vocals on "How Might I Live"
Jackson Pollis – drums and percussion
Matt Kallman – keyboards
Julian Lynch – clarinet

Technical
Tom Schick – engineering, mixing and production
Mark Greenberg – assistant engineering
Alex Nappi – assistant mixing
Kabir Hermon – assistant mixing
Greg Calbi – mastering

Design
Rob Carmichael – graphic design
Irmgard Carpenter – photography
Shawn Brackbill – photography
Charles Poekel – photography

References

2014 albums
Real Estate (band) albums
Domino Recording Company albums